Shir Kola or Shirkala may refer to:
 Shir Kola, Neka
 Shir Kola, Nur
 Shir Kola, Savadkuh